Adămuș is a commune in Mureș County, Transylvania, Romania. It is composed of six villages: Adămuș, Chinciuș (Kincses), Cornești (Sövényfalva), Crăiești (Magyarkirályfalva), Dâmbău (Küküllődombó) and Herepea (Magyarherepe).

Geography
The commune is situated on the Transylvanian Plateau, on the left bank of the river Târnava Mică. It is located in the southwestern part of the county, on the border with Alba County and near the border with Sibiu County.

History
Until 1918, the village belonged to the Kis-Küküllő County of the Kingdom of Hungary. After the Hungarian–Romanian War of 1918–19 and the Treaty of Trianon of 1920, it became part of Romania.

Demographics
According to the 2011 census, Adămuș has a population of 5,147, of which 43.46% are Romanians, 38.47% are Hungarians,  and 14.96% are Roma.

Natives
 (born 1933), sculptor
 (born 1922), painter
 (1885–1977), pastor

See also
List of Hungarian exonyms (Mureș County)

References

Communes in Mureș County
Localities in Transylvania
Székely communities